Canzone napoletana, sometimes referred to as Neapolitan song, is a generic term for a traditional form of music sung in the Neapolitan language, ordinarily for the male voice singing solo, although well represented by female soloists as well, and expressed in familiar genres such as the love song and serenade.  Many of the songs are about the nostalgic longing for Naples as it once was.  The genre consists of a large body of composed popular music—such songs as "’O sole mio"; "Torna a Surriento"; "Funiculì, Funiculà"; "Santa Lucia" and others.

The Neapolitan song became a formal institution in the 1830s due to an annual song-writing competition for the Festival of Piedigrotta, dedicated to the Madonna of Piedigrotta, a well-known church in the Mergellina area of Naples. The winner of the first festival was a song entitled "Te voglio bene assaie"; it is traditionally attributed to the prominent opera composer Gaetano Donizetti, although an article published in 1984 by Marcello Sorce Keller shows there is no historical evidence in support of the attribution. The festival ran regularly until 1950, when it was abandoned. A subsequent Festival of Neapolitan Song on Italian state radio enjoyed some success in the 1950s but was eventually abandoned as well.

The period since 1950 has produced such songs as "Malafemmena" by Totò, "" by Renato Carosone, "Indifferentemente" by Mario Trevi and "Carmela" by Sergio Bruni.  Although separated by some decades from the earlier classics of this genre, they have now become Neapolitan "classics" in their own right.

History
Many of the Neapolitan songs are world-famous because they were taken abroad by emigrants from Naples and southern Italy, roughly between 1880 and 1920. The music also was popularized abroad by performers such as Enrico Caruso, who took to singing the popular music of his native city as encores at the Metropolitan Opera in New York in the early 1900s. Caruso also recorded many of these songs, which subsequently became part of the standard repertoire for operatic tenors, and which were performed and recorded by such notable singers as Beniamino Gigli, Francesco Albanese, Franco Corelli, Mario Del Monaco, Giuseppe Di Stefano, and Tito Schipa. The Three Tenors also performed popular songs from Naples. Plácido Domingo recorded a full CD Italia ti amo of traditional and some more modern Neapolitan and Italian songs. Luciano Pavarotti recorded three albums of Neapolitan and Italian songs: The Best: Disc 2, (2005), Pavarotti Songbook, (1991), and Romantica, (2002). Mario Lanza recorded an acclaimed selection of 12 Neapolitan songs on his 1959 album, Mario! Lanza At His Best. Opera/pop crossover tenor, Sergio Franchi recorded his very popular Billboard Top 25 RCA debut album, Romantic Italian Songs in 1962, and continued to record Neapolitan songs on most of his albums throughout his career. Andrea Bocelli recorded an album in 2009 dedicated to the style, entitled Incanto.

The most important native Neapolitan performers of Neapolitan songs in the last few decades include Roberto Murolo, Bruno Venturini, Mario Trevi, Mario Abbate, Mario Merola, Giulietta Sacco, Franco Ricci, Sergio Bruni, Renato Carosone, and Mario Maglione. Murolo is known not only as a singer and guitarist, but also as a composer, scholar and collector of the music; his collection of twelve LPs, released in the 1960s, is an annotated compendium of Neapolitan song dating back to the twelfth century. Representatives of different veins, but nevertheless leading the continuing tradition of song in Neapolitan, are the jazz-rock singer-songwriter Pino Daniele and the folkloric group Nuova Compagnia di Canto Popolare.

An important factor in defining what makes a Neapolitan song is the matter of language. All these songs are written and performed in the Neapolitan language. Although the music is sung by many non-Neapolitan singers, it is difficult to sing correctly without knowledge of the Neapolitan dialect, which is crucial in obtaining the correct inflection. The matter of dialect has not prevented a few non-Neapolitans from writing dialect versions of Neapolitan songs. The most famous examples of this are ’A vucchella by Gabriele D'Annunzio and Tu sì 'na cosa grande by Domenico Modugno.

List of songs

'A vucchella
Accarezzame
Canzone amalfitana
Caruso
C'è la luna mezz'o mare
Cerasella
Comme facette mammeta
Core 'ngrato
Cu 'mmé
Dicitencello vuje
Era de maggio
Fenesta vascia
Funiculì, Funiculà
Guaglione
'I te vurria vasa'
Indifferentemente
Lacreme napulitane
Lazzarella
Luna caprese
Luna rossa
Malafemmena
Mamma mia che vo sapé
Mare verde
Marechiare
Marenariello
María, Marí
Munasterio 'e Santa Chiara
Na' sera e' maggio
'O marenariello
'O paese d'o Sole
'O sarracino
'O sole mio
'O surdato 'nnammurato
Passione
Pecché?
Reginella
Rose rosse
Santa Lucia
Santa Lucia Luntana
Tiempe belle
Torna a Surriento
Tu Vuò Fà L'Americano
Voce ′e notte

Noted figures

Recording artists

Mario Abbate
Francesco Albanese
Renzo Arbore
Andrea Bocelli
Sergio Bruni
Renato Carosone
Enrico Caruso
Franco Corelli
Nino D'Angelo
Gigi D'Alessio
Gabriele D'Annunzio
Pino Daniele
Mario Del Monaco
Giuseppe Di Stefano
Elvira Donnarumma
Aurelio Fierro
Gigi Finizio
Sergio Franchi
Natale Galletta
Beniamino Gigli
Mario Lanza
Angela Luce
Mario Maglione
Mia Martini
Joe Masiello
Mario Merola
Gilda Mignonette
Roberto Murolo
Tullio Pane
Maria Paris
Gennaro Pasquariello
Luciano Pavarotti 
Massimo Ranieri
Giacomo Rondinella
Jimmy Roselli
Giulietta Sacco
Lina Sastri
Tito Schipa
Totò
Mario Trevi
Roberto Alagna

Composers

Pasquale Mario Costa
Pino Daniele
Ernesto De Curtis
Luigi Denza
Peppino di Capri
Eduardo di Capua
Enzo Gragnaniello
E. A. Mario
Salvatore Mazzocco
Emanuele Nutile
Raffaele Sacco
Francesco Paolo Tosti

See also
:it:Canzoni della tradizione classica napoletana (1830-1970)
Tarantella
Festival di Napoli (Festival della Canzone Napoletana)

References

Bibliography 
Marcello Sorce Keller, “Continuing Opera with Other Means: Opera, Neapolitan Song, and Popular Music among Italian Immigrants Overseas”, Forum Italicum, Vol. XLIX(2015), No 3, 1- 20.

External links
List of texts of several Neapolitan songs
Sheet music for 30 Neapolitan Songs

 
Italian folk music
Italian popular music